Time in Niger is given by a single time zone, officially denoted as West Africa Time (WAT; UTC+01:00). Niger adopted WAT on 1 January 1912, and has never observed daylight saving time.

IANA time zone database 
In the IANA time zone database, Niger is given one zone in the file zone.tab – Africa/Niamey. "NE" refers to the country's ISO 3166-1 alpha-2 country code. Data for Niger directly from zone.tab of the IANA time zone database; columns marked with * are the columns from zone.tab itself:

See also 
List of time zones by country
List of UTC time offsets

References

External links 
Current time in Niger at Time.is
Time in Niger at TimeAndDate.com

Time in Niger